Grand Prix and other major automobile races in Italy.
10 Hours of Messina
 Adriana Grand Prix
Alessandria Grand Prix
Bari Grand Prix
Circuito di Avellino
Circuito del Garda 
Coppa Acerbo
Pescara Grand Prix
Coppa Ciano
Coppa della Toscana
Coppa Florio
Coppa d'Oro di Sicilia
Coppa d'Oro delle Dolomiti
Giro di Sicilia automobilistico
Giro d'Italia automobilistico
International Rally of Messina
Grand Prix of Italy
Grand Prix of Modena
Grand Prix of Naples
Grand Prix of Rome
Grand Prix of Turin
Mediterranean Grand Prix
Messina Grand Prix
Milan Grand Prix
Mille Miglia
Mugello Circuit
Grand Prix of Mugello
Rally d'Italia
Rally di Sanremo (1970–2003)
Rally di Sardegna (2004–2018)
Sardegna Rally Race
San Marino Grand Prix
San Remo Grand Prix
Syracuse Grand Prix
Targa Florio

 
Italy